Okanagodes gracilis is a species of cicada in the family Cicadidae. It is found in Central America and North America.

Subspecies
These two subspecies belong to the species Okanagodes gracilis:
 Okanagodes gracilis gracilis Davis, 1919
 Okanagodes gracilis viridis Davis, 1934

References

Further reading

 

Articles created by Qbugbot
Insects described in 1919
Tibicinini